Nikita Vyacheslavovich Glushkov (born 9 June 1992) is a Russian professional football player.

Club career
He made his Russian Football National League debut for FC Rotor Volgograd on 9 July 2012 in a game against FC Tom Tomsk.

External links
 Career summary by sportbox.ru

1992 births
Sportspeople from Volgograd
Living people
Russian footballers
Association football midfielders
FC Energiya Volzhsky players
FC Rotor Volgograd players
FC Armavir players
FC Khimik-Arsenal players
FC Dynamo Stavropol players
FC Baltika Kaliningrad players
FC Zenit-Izhevsk players
FC Dynamo Bryansk players
FC Olimpia Volgograd players